Sadad may refer to:

 Sadad, Bahrain
 Sadad, Syria
 The SADAD payment system in Saudi Arabia